The Warrior Strain is a 1919 British silent war film directed by Floyd Martin Thornton and starring Sydney Wood, Harry Agar Lyons and J. Edwards Barker. The future Edward VIII, then Prince of Wales, appeared in the film. During the First World War, a group of British cadets thwart the plans of a German agent. It bears strong similarities to The Power of Right also directed by Thornton and featuring the Prince of Wales, which was released the same year.

Cast
 Sydney Wood as Lord Billy
 Harry Agar Lyons as Sir William Halsford
 J. Edwards Barker as Baron Housen
 William Parry as Stocker
 Evelyn Boucher
 Prince of Wales as himself

References

Bibliography
 Bamford, Kenton. Distorted Images: British National Identity and Film in the 1920s. I.B. Tauris, 1999.
 Chapman, James. War and Film. Reaktion Books, 2008.

External links

1919 films
British war films
British silent feature films
1910s English-language films
Films directed by Floyd Martin Thornton
Films set in Sussex
British black-and-white films
1919 war films
Silent war films
1910s British films